Late Night Software Ltd., is a privately held Canadian software company that has produced several applications, utilities, and developer's tools for the Macintosh computer platform. The company was established in 1995. Its president is Mark Alldritt.

Software

Applications 
In 1995, Late Night Software released what is now their main product, Script Debugger. At the time, there were several competing AppleScript and Open Scripting Architecture (OSA) language source code editors, including ScriptWizard and Main Event Software's Scripter. As of May, 2005, Script Debugger and Smile remain the only competitors to Apple Computer's freeware Script Editor application.

In 2004, the company released Affrus, a Mac OS X native debugger for the Perl scripting language.

In 2005, the company acquired FaceSpan from Digital Technology International. FaceSpan was a competing product to Apple Computer's AppleScript Studio. This marked Late Night Software's first entry into graphically-based rapid application development tools.

On May 5, 2009, after over 2 years of development on FaceSpan 5, Alldritt announced in the company's blog that development had been suspended because "in the time it has taken me to do this work, the world has moved on and AppleScript-based UIs are not going to be relevant in the marketplace."

Scripting Additions 
Early in the history of the AppleScript scripting language, Mark Alldritt produced a freeware Scripting Addition called Script Tools. This was later repackaged as a commercial product, LNS Scripting Additions. Owing to changes in the Macintosh operating system, Script Tools has been discontinued and is no longer available.

XML Tools brought native XML parsing to AppleScript and other OSA languages. It uses James Clark's Expat XML parser.

XSLT Tools brought native XSLT transformations to AppleScript and other OSA languages. It is based on the Apache Software Foundation's Xerces-C XML parser Xalan-C XSLT processor.

List & Record Tools allows set logic commands to be performed on AppleScript lists, and dynamic property access to AppleScript records.

Property List Tools allows native AppleScript parsing of the Mac OS X Property Lists file type (".plist" files).

Utilities and Plugins 
JavaScript OSA is an Open Scripting Architecture scripting language. It is a system-level scripting language, based on the SpiderMonkey engine, intended as an alternative to AppleScript.

OSA for Dreamweaver allows Macromedia Dreamweaver to be scripted via AppleScript and other OSA languages.

OSAXen Fixer is a utility that allows REALbasic to directly call on Scripting Additions without going through AppleScript.

Scheduler was a utility that allowed the scheduled launching of applications and the opening of documents, in response to various events. It was fully scriptable and script-attachable via AppleScript and other OSA languages. Scheduler has been discontinued and is no longer available.

SCRIPZ was a product for Adobe Illustrator that brought scripting support to Illustrator version 7.0. SCRIPZ supported both Visual Basic/COM on Windows and AppleScript/Apple events on the Macintosh. In 1998, SCRIPZ was acquired by Adobe Systems. SCRIPZ functionality was natively incorporated into Illustrator version 9.0.

Tag-On was an Adobe InDesign plug-in, which provided the ability to import text formatted using QuarkXPress XPress Tags into InDesign. The product was never updated to work with "InDesign CS".

References

External links

Software companies of Canada
Macintosh software companies